Trams in Teschen was a tramway system that operated in the former Austro-Hungarian town of Teschen (modern incarnation: Cieszyn, Poland and Český Těšín, Czechoslovakia) from 12 February 1911 to 2 April 1921.

History 
In 1910 the Košice–Bohumín Railway was built and town's administration decided to build a tramway from railway station to the town square. First tram started work on 12 February 1911 on the 1793-metres long way. There were four trams in Cieszyn built by Ringhoffer company from Prague. In 1920, the town was divided into two parts between the newly created states of Czechoslovakia and Poland, and on 2 April 1921 trams were defunct and trams were sold to Łódź.

Further reading

External links 

 Trams in Cieszyn 1911-1921

Cieszyn
Transport in Cieszyn
Metre gauge railways in Poland
Teschen